Rishton Cricket Club is a cricket club in the Lancashire League, which plays its home games at Blackburn Road in Rishton, Lancashire, England. For the 2017 season their captain is Matt Lambert and professional is Shaun von Berg.

The club was formed in 1865 and became a founder member of the Lancashire League in 1892. The club has won the League on eight occasions. The club has employed many well-known cricketers as professionals including Sydney Barnes, Allan Donald, Michael Holding and Viv Richards.

Former Accrington Stanley chairman and local businessman, Eric Whalley, was club captain of Rishton.

Honours
1st XI League Winners - 8 - 1898, 1912, 1944, 1948, 1955, 1995, 1996, 2007
Worsley Cup Winners - 6 - 1922, 1932, 1955, 1964, 1967, 1973
Inter League Club Challenge Trophy Winners - 1 - 2001
20/20 Cup Winners - 1 - 2006
2nd XI League Winners - 4 - 1913, 1933, 1953, 1954
2nd XI (Lancashire Telegraph) Cup Winners - 1 - 2001
3rd XI League Winners - 2 - 1985, 1988
Highest 50 overs score - 340-6 v Lowerhouse, 4 August 2001

References

External links
Rishton CC at lancashireleague.com

Lancashire League cricket clubs
Sport in Hyndburn
1865 establishments in England
Rishton